David Attenborough's Natural Curiosities is a British nature documentary series first broadcast on Eden in January 2013, Produced by Humble Bee Films, Sir David Attenborough presents the series which puts a spotlight on some of nature's evolutionary anomalies and how these curious animals continue to baffle and fascinate.

The second series began on 18 February 2014 on Watch.

The series premiered in Australia on Network Ten on 3 November 2013.

References

External links
 David Attenborough's Natural Curiosities at BBC Earth
 David Attenborough's Natural Curiosities on the Eden website
 David Attenborough's Natural Curiosities on the Watch website
 Humble Bee Films

2010s British documentary television series
2013 British television series debuts
2017 British television series endings
UKTV original programming
Nature educational television series
Documentary films about nature
David Attenborough